Kerstin Hinze is a German rower, who competed for the SG Dynamo Potsdam / Sportvereinigung (SV) Dynamo. She won the medals at the international rowing competitions, including a gold medal at the 1986 Rowing World Cup in Nottingham.

References 

Living people
East German female rowers
World Rowing Championships medalists for East Germany
Year of birth missing (living people)